Malice Aforethought is a 2005 ITV drama based on Anthony Berkeley Cox’s 1931 novel of the same name, made by Granada Television.  There was an earlier BBC television adaptation of this novel in 1979.

Synopsis
Set in a 1920's village in Devon. The plot concerns the complicated love life of Dr. Edmund Bickleigh and his plans to resolve his unhappy marriage by murdering his wife.  It is an early and well-known example of the "inverted detective story".

Cast
Dr Edmund Bickleigh – Ben Miller
Julia Bickleigh – Barbara Flynn
Ivy Ridgeway – Lucy Brown
Madeleine Cranmere – Megan Dodds
Mrs Ridgeway – Kate O’Toole
Widdicombe – Peter Vaughan
William Chatford – Richard Armitage

External links 
 ITV 2005: 

2005 British television series debuts
2005 British television series endings
2000s British drama television series
2000s British television miniseries
ITV television dramas
Television shows based on British novels
English-language television shows
Television shows produced by Granada Television
Television series by ITV Studios
British drama films
Films directed by David Blair (director)